Incoming Forces is a shooter video game developed by Rage Software and published by Hip Interactive. It is the sequel to the 1998 video game Incoming. The game's plot picks up after the plot of the original game.

Reception

Incoming Forces received "average" reviews according to the review aggregation website Metacritic.

Incoming Trilogy digital re-release
In March 2015, Funbox Media, Ltd, owners of the Incoming brand, revealed that the Jordan Freeman Group was able to successfully convert the Incoming Subversion expansion pack for modern PCs. The Incoming Trilogy comes bundled with the original Incoming, Incoming Forces, and the Incoming Subversion expansion pack. Incoming Trilogy comes bundled with its original soundtracks and original manuals. The Incoming Trilogy is distributed via JFG's ZOOM-Platform.com.

References

External links
 

2002 video games
Shooter video games
Tank simulation video games
Video game sequels
Video games developed in the United Kingdom
Windows games
Windows-only games
Multiplayer and single-player video games
Rage Games games